Abraham Regelson (1896–1981; Hebrew: אברהם רגלסון) was an Israeli Hebrew poet, author, children's author, translator, and editor.

Biography

Abraham Regelson was born in Hlusk, now Belarus, in the Russian Empire in 1896, and died at his home in Neveh Monossohn, Israel in 1981. His parents were Yehuda Zeev Regelson and Rashel Ozick. He is the maternal uncle of Cynthia Ozick.

Regelson emigrated with his family to the United States when he was nine years old. He studied at a heder and public schools. He never finished formal studies, but was an autodidact who spent many hours in libraries.

Literary and journalism career

At first he earned his livelihood as a librarian and Hebrew teacher, and began publishing his poetry, stories and translations in various Hebrew publications, both in America and in what was then  Palestine. His first aliya (immigration) to Eretz Israel was in the year 1933. 

Employed by the daily newspaper Davar, he was one of the founders of the children's weekly supplement Davar l'Yladim, where his  classic "Masa HaBubot l'Eretz-Yisrael" ("The Dolls' Journey to Eretz Israel") was first published in installments. Three years later, after having lost an infant son, and with two of his older children endangered by malaria, he returned to the US with his family. There he earned his living by writing for the Yiddish press, while publishing several books containing his Hebrew poetry, legends and philosophical essays.

He returned to Israel in 1949, where he worked as an editor for the publishing house Am Oved. He  was also on the staff of the daily newspaper Al Ha-Mishmar, where he featured as a regular columnist.

Regelson's language  combined old and new in a captivating style. His innovative usages contributed to the rejuvenation of the Hebrew tongue. The influence of English literature added an appealing flavor to his work. He was a prolific translator and enriched Hebrew with many classics of English literature.

Awards and recognition
 In 1964, Regelson was awarded the Brenner Prize.
 In 1972, he was awarded the Bialik Prize for literature.
 In 1976, he won the Neuman Prize from New York University's (NYU) Hebrew Department for his contribution to Hebrew literature.

See also
List of Hebrew language authors
List of Bialik Prize recipients

References

Further reading

External links 
 A commemorative website
 Many of Regelson's works have been made available through The Ben-Yehuda Project website

1896 births
1981 deaths
Israeli children's writers
Israeli poets
Israeli translators
Hebrew-language poets
Modern Hebrew writers
Brenner Prize recipients
Israeli Jews
Belarusian Jews
Jews in Mandatory Palestine
Emigrants from the Russian Empire to the United States
Israeli people of Belarusian-Jewish descent
American emigrants to Israel
20th-century translators
20th-century poets